Statistics of Japan Soccer League for the 1985–86 season.

First Division
Led by their star player Yasuhiko Okudera, who had returned to the club after successful periods in Europe, Furukawa Electric won their second title. Okudera became the first widely recognized professional Japanese player.

Sumitomo and ANA Yokohama were relegated after one season in the top division.

Second Division
No relegation took place for a second wave of expansion that would bring the division's number of clubs to 16.

First stage

East

West

Second stage

Promotion Group

Relegation Group

East

West

7-12 Playoff

References
Japan - List of final tables (RSSSF)

Japan Soccer League seasons
1985 in Japanese football
1986 in Japanese football
Japan Soccer League